"Lucky Man" is a song written by David Cory Lee and Dave Turnbull and recorded by American country music duo Montgomery Gentry. It was released in January 2007 as the second single from the duo's 2006 album Some People Change. The song became their third number one single on the US Billboard Hot Country Songs chart and stayed there for two weeks.

The song received a 2008 nomination for Grammy Award for Best Country Performance by a Duo or Group with Vocal, the duo's first nomination.

Content
The song opens with the narrator listing various small things that annoy him, such as his job and the weather; however, he then reminds himself, "I know I'm a lucky man / God's given me a pretty fair hand", and turns to recounting all of the luxuries in his life, from his family to his health to his truck to his new fishing rod.

The second line of the song’s first verse, "And last Sunday, when my Bengals lost / Lord, it put me in a bad mood" was edited for different markets; 81 additional team names from the MLB, NHL, NBA, NFL, and NCAA (in place of the Cincinnati Bengals) in these different edits, depending on the market.

20 Years of Hits Version
In November 2018, Montgomery Gentry released a new rendition of the song, featuring fellow American country artist Darius Rucker. The new rendition is part of a 20th anniversary album, Montgomery Gentry: 20 Years of Hits.

Chart positions

Year-end charts

References

Songs about luck
2007 singles
2006 songs
Montgomery Gentry songs
Columbia Records singles
Song recordings produced by Mark Wright (record producer)
Songs written by Dave Turnbull